The Snow Bowl is the nickname of a National Football League game played on December 1, 1985, between the Green Bay Packers and Tampa Bay Buccaneers at Lambeau Field in Green Bay, Wisconsin. It is known for its heavy snow. Only 19,856 were in attendance, with over 36,000 "no-shows", the most in Packers history (though due to the game selling out well in advance, it was not blacked out on local television, nor has any Packers home game since 1973 been blacked out, with one exception, due to a sell-out streak dating back to the early 1960s). About two-thirds of the stadium was empty.  of snow fell before the game and another  fell during the game.

The game itself saw the Packers dominate the Buccaneers en route to a 21–0 victory. Despite four turnovers, the Packers offense gained 512 total yards on 31 first downs, with the Buccaneers recording only 65 yards on 5 first downs. Packers wide receiver James Lofton received passes totaling over 100 yards from quarterback Lynn Dickey by halftime. Packers defensive end Alphonso Carreker sacked Buccaneers quarterback and future Pro Football Hall of Fame enshrinee Steve Young a then team-record four times. It was Young's second game in the league after he left the USFL.

Game conditions
Green Bay wide receiver Preston Dennard described getting to the game, "There was a big, heavy snow 4–5 inches on the ground. Roads in my neighborhood were packed—I couldn't get out.

"My neighbors came out of their houses and dug about an eighth of a mile so I could get out and go to the stadium; the main roads were plowed. There were about 20 people out there—I'll never, ever forget that."

Tampa Bay wore their white "away" team jerseys, which were difficult to see during the whiteout conditions. Coaches and commentators had difficulty seeing the field. Between plays, grounds crew workers swept snow off the lines marking the field.

Dennard described catching the football, "I think it was pretty close to 20-below. It was snowing—you could barely see past 15 yards. All you knew is coming out of the mist of the snow and the white mist, you would see the ball come out of the white. You knew what the route was and you knew the direction of the ball."

Officials 
Referee: Ben Dreith (#12)
Umpire: Ed Fiffick (#57)
Head Linesman: Dale Williams (#8)
Line Judge: Ron DeSouza (#45)
Back Judge: Don Wedge (#28)
Side Judge: Tom Fincken (#47)
Field Judge: Dick Dolack (#31)

See also
 Ice Bowl (disambiguation)
 Fog Bowl (disambiguation)
 Mud Bowl (disambiguation)

References

External links
 Remmel: Packers vs Bucs
 Carreker's play never lived up to hype Milwaukee Journal Sentinel, February 13, 2002.

1985 National Football League season
National Football League games
History of the Green Bay Packers
Tampa Bay Buccaneers
December 1985 sports events in the United States
1985 in sports in Wisconsin
Sports in Green Bay, Wisconsin
Nicknamed sporting events